Edward Dodd (August 25, 1805 – March 1, 1891) was a U.S. Representative from New York.

Early life
Edward Dodd was born in Salem, New York on August 25, 1805. He attended the public schools.

Career
He engaged in mercantile pursuits. He moved to Argyle, New York in 1835. He served as county clerk of Washington County from 1835 to 1844. He served as delegate to the State constitutional convention in 1846.

Dodd was elected as an Opposition Party candidate to the Thirty-fourth Congress and re-elected as a Republican to the Thirty-fifth Congress (March 4, 1855 – March 3, 1859). He served as chairman of the Committee on District of Columbia (Thirty-fourth Congress).

He served as the United States marshal for the northern district of New York from April 1863 to April 1869. He was editor of the County Post for thirty years.

He was a Trustee of the Argyle Academy for fifty-one years. He served as president of the village of Argyle for eight years. He served as member of the Republican State committee for many years.

Death
He died in Argyle, New York, March 1, 1891. He was interred in Prospect Hill Cemetery.

References

1805 births
1891 deaths
People from Salem, New York
Opposition Party members of the United States House of Representatives from New York (state)
Republican Party members of the United States House of Representatives from New York (state)
United States Marshals
People from Argyle, New York
19th-century American politicians